Grand Prix motorcycle racing is the premier championship of motorcycle road racing, which has been divided into three classes: MotoGP, Moto2, and Moto3. Classes that have been discontinued include 500cc (although 500cc statistics are combined with MotoGP officially), 350cc, 250cc, 125cc, 80cc, 50cc and Sidecar.  The Grand Prix Road-Racing World Championship was established in 1949 by the sport's governing body, the Fédération Internationale de Motocyclisme (FIM), and is the oldest motorsport World Championship.

Valentino Rossi holds the record for the most race fastest laps recorded in the premier 500cc/MotoGP class with 76. Giacomo Agostini is second with 69 fastest laps, and Marc Márquez is third with 59 fastest laps.

By rider

By nationality

References

Fastest lap